Joes may refer to:
 Joes, Colorado, a settlement in the United States
 Joes Mountain, several mountains
 Jef Joes, or just Joes, an island in West Papua, Indonesia
 Joes, a term used for the banknotes of Demerary and Essequibo

See also 
 
 Joe (disambiguation)